Severn's Building is a Grade II listed building dating from the 15th century in Castle Road, Nottingham.

History

Severn's Building dates from around 1450. It was built as a Merchant's house and located on Middle Pavement. When the street was numbered, it became no. 10. From 1879 to 1885 it was the offices of Samuel Dutton Walker and John Howitt, architects. 

John and James Severn operated a wine and spirit business on Middle Pavement and in 1900 they moved into this building.

After the Second World War the owners put forwards plans for alterations to it. The roof of the yard was extensively damaged in the Nottingham Blitz. It was also under threat as there were plans to widen Middle Pavement. 

In 1968 it was taken down by F.W.B. Charles, and its former site on Middle Pavement became part of the Broadmarsh Centre. It was reassembled on Castle Road by 1970. From 1980, Jack Richards operated it as a Lace museum and shop of Lace. This closed in 2009. Owned by the city council, the building was put up for sale in 2012.

References

Grade II listed buildings in Nottinghamshire
Buildings and structures in Nottingham
Timber framed buildings in England
Houses completed in the 15th century